Nawadih is a village and a gram panchayat in the Markacho CD block in the Koderma subdivision of  the Koderma district in the Indian state of Jharkhand.

Geography

Location                             

Overview
Koderma district is plateau territory and around 60% of the total area is covered with forests. The first dam of the Damodar Valley Corporation, at Tilaiya, was built across the Barakar River and inaugurated in 1953. Koderma Junction railway station has emerged as an important railway centre in the region. It is a predominantly rural district with only 19.72% urban population.

Note: The map alongside presents some of the notable locations in the district. All places marked in the map are linked in the larger full screen map.

Demographics
According to the 2011 Census of India, Nawadih had a total population of 1,271, of which 642 (51%) were males and 629 (49%) were females. Population in the age range 0–6 years was 246. The total number of literate persons in Nawadih  was 757 (73.85% of the population over 6 years).

Transport

The 111 km long railway project from Koderma to Giridih costing  787.87 crore was inaugurated from Koderma to Nawadih on 26 June 2013, by Babulal Marandi, the JVM-P Chief. Passenger services were started in the fully operational Madhupur-Giridih-Koderma line in 2019.

References

Villages in Koderma district